Joshua Leary (born 11 June 1989), better known by the stage name Evian Christ, is an English electronic music producer, DJ, songwriter and performance artist from Ellesmere Port, UK. He is signed to Tri Angle Records, Warp and Kanye West’s publishing house Donda and record label Very Good Beats. He released his debut mixtape Kings and Them in 2012 and gained prominence as a collaborator on West's 2013 album Yeezus. He released a further EP on Tri Angle, Waterfall, in 2014.

In August 2015 he pulled out of Reading Festival after claiming to have been detained by security staff at the Leeds sister festival.

Life and career 
Leary grew up in the small town of Ellesmere Port, near Liverpool. He began making music after playing around with vintage keyboards belonging to his father, who initially made Kraftwerk-influenced synth music before becoming a trance DJ in the late ’90s. At 19 he produced a selection of J. Dilla-influenced soul edits, and intended to release them until the label he had partnered with went out of business. While training to be a primary school teacher at Edge Hill University, Leary produced the eight tracks that would make up his debut mixtape, Kings And Them. Made music in his garage on Cubase. In December 2011, he posted three of the tracks on YouTube under the name Evian Christ, apparently only for his friends to hear. They were discovered by Dummy Magazine and other music blogs, which led to a search for his identity.

After the tracks blew up, Leary responded to a message from Tri Angle Records founder Robin Carolan, who signed him to the label. In February 2012, Tri Angle released Kings And Them, a free mixtape compiling his musical output thus far. Days after, Leary made his live debut at a Tri Angle showcase in London alongside Balam Acab, Romy xx, and The Haxan Cloak. Directly after graduating from his education program, Leary left the UK to tour in America. In July 2012, Tri Angle rereleased Kings And Them as a limited edition 12" EP featuring remastered versions of mixtape tracks "Fuck It None Of Y’All Don’t Rap," "Thrown Like Jacks," "Drip," and "MYD."

In 2013, Kanye West reached out to Leary to produce material for his then-upcoming record Yeezus. West flew him out to Paris, where he worked with in-house engineers and producers to create the album track "I’m In It." By the end of the year, West signed Evian Christ to his publishing house, DONDA. In the same year, Leary attended the Red Bull Music Academy in New York City.

Leary released his debut EP, Waterfall, in March 2014. He also announced work for the follow-up to Yeezus, and hosted a set of club nights called TranceParty in the UK. In 2015, collaborated with artist David Rudnick to create a temporary art installation at London's ICA, and expanded TranceParty, with the fourth edition taking place in Liverpool, London and Sheffield.

In August 2016, Leary produced "Pneumonia," the second single from rapper Danny Brown's critically acclaimed fourth studio album, Atrocity Exhibition. The single was officially released on August 19 through Warp Records.

Style and influences 
He was always inspired by his dad's trance DJing and then went on to discover R&B and hip-hop through MTV Base. Later, he stumbled upon experimental electronica and ambient music through Grouper, Tim Hecker and Ben Frost. He tends to describe his music as deconstructionist, using samples from mainstream rap artists such as Tyga and combining them with his own dark, industrial beats.

Discography

Extended plays 
Duga-3 (2013)
Waterfall (2014)

Mixtapes 
 Kings and Them (2012)

Production discography

2013 
Kanye West – Yeezus
 6. "I'm in It" (produced with Kanye West, Dom Solo, Noah Goldstein, Arca, and Mike Dean)
The Alchemist and Oh No – Welcome to Los Santos
 6. "20's 50's 100's" (King Avriel featuring A$AP Ferg) (produced with Oh No)

2014 
Tinashe – Aquarius

 10. "Indigo Child (Interlude)"

2015 
Le1f – Riot Boi

 6. "Umami/Water" (produced with Lunice, Le1f, Aron, and Boody)
3. "Grace Alek Naomi" (produced with Boody)

2016 
Travis Scott – Birds in the Trap Sing McKnight

 1. "The Ends" (produced with Vinylz, Daxz, WondaGurl, OZ)

Danny Brown – Atrocity Exhibition
 9. "Pneumonia"

2017 
Cashmere Cat – 9

 2. "Europa Pools" (produced with Cashmere Cat)
Yung Sherman – Innocence v2
 2. "I D C - Evian Christ Remix" (produced with Yung Sherman)

2020 
 1. "Ultra - Evian Christ"

References

External links

Living people
British DJs
British dance musicians
British electronic musicians
Place of birth missing (living people)
1989 births
Electronic dance music DJs